Jamie Waller (born November 20, 1964) is an American former professional basketball player who played for the New Jersey Nets of the National Basketball Association. A 6'4" guard-forward, Waller played college basketball at the historically black Virginia Union University, an NCAA Division II institution at Richmond. Waller also played in the Continental Basketball Association, and won the league's 1988 Rookie of the Year Award.

References

External links 
basketballreference.com
basketball.realgm.com
databasebasketball.com

1964 births
Living people
American expatriate basketball people in France
American expatriate basketball people in the Philippines
Barangay Ginebra San Miguel players
Basketball players from Virginia
Charleston Gunners players
Élan Béarnais players
New Jersey Nets draft picks
New Jersey Nets players
Philippine Basketball Association imports
Quad City Thunder players
Small forwards
Virginia Union Panthers men's basketball players
People from South Boston, Virginia
American men's basketball players